Zumbahua is a town in Pujilí Canton, Cotopaxi Province, Ecuador. At the 2001 census, Zumbahua had a population of 11,895 (5,455 men and 6,440 women) living in 2,352 households.

Zumbahua residents are predominantly Quichua, of the Panzaleo group.

The town has a colorful Saturday market. Houses in Zumbahua were traditionally chozas, but in recent years these have been replaced by cement and metal block houses.

References

Further reading
Baltazar Umajinga. "Zumbahua". In Identidades indias en el Ecuador contemporáneo (José Almeida Vinueza, coordinator). Editorial Abya Yala (1995), pp. 247–272. .

Populated places in Cotopaxi Province